Peter Thorstensen (1752–1792) was a Danish physician and chemist who settled in Norway.

He was born in Denmark to immigrants from Iceland, and studied medicine in Copenhagen. His doctoral thesis in 1775 examined medical use of quassin from the plant quassia amara. He was appointed as physician in Kongsberg, at the Kongsberg Silver Mines. From 1784 he lectured at the Kongsberg School of Mines, in chemistry, physics and mineralogy.

References

1752 births
1792 deaths
Danish people of Icelandic descent
18th-century Danish physicians
Danish chemists
Danish emigrants to Norway